"Money So Big" (stylized as "Monëy So Big") is a song by American rapper Yeat from his debut studio album Up 2 Me (2021). It was produced by Trgc and Nest. It gained traction through the video-sharing platform TikTok and has become one of Yeat's most popular songs.

Composition
AllMusic described Yeat as "bending melodic hooks into distorted bleats on the fast-switching flows" in the song.

Charts

Weekly charts

Year-end charts

Certifications

References

2021 songs
Yeat songs